Clas Haraldsson (1 September 1922 – 14 August 1984) was a Swedish cross-country skier. He competed in the 18 km event at the 1948 Winter Olympics.

Cross-country skiing results

Olympic Games

References

1922 births
1984 deaths
Swedish male cross-country skiers
Swedish male Nordic combined skiers
Olympic cross-country skiers of Sweden
Olympic Nordic combined skiers of Sweden
Cross-country skiers at the 1948 Winter Olympics
Nordic combined skiers at the 1948 Winter Olympics
People from Lycksele Municipality